Close to the Edge is the second studio album by American country music group Diamond Rio. Released in 1992 on Arista Records, it produced the singles "In a Week or Two", "Oh Me, Oh My, Sweet Baby", "This Romeo Ain't Got Julie Yet", and "Sawmill Road". These singles respectively reached #2, #5, #13 and #21 on the Billboard country charts between 1992 and 1993; the album was certified gold in the United States. "Oh Me, Oh My, Sweet Baby" was previously recorded by George Strait on his 1989 album Beyond the Blue Neon.

Track listing

Personnel 
Diamond Rio
 Marty Roe – acoustic guitars, lead vocals
 Dan Truman – keyboards
 Jimmy Olander – lead guitars, banjo
 Gene Johnson – mandolin, backing vocals
 Dana Williams – bass, backing vocals 
 Brian Prout – drums, percussion

Production 
 Tim DuBois – producer 
 Monty Powell – producer 
 Mike Clute – engineer, mixing 
 John Hurley – additional recording, assistant engineer, mix assistant 
 John Kunz – additional recording, assistant engineer
 Herb Tassin – additional recording, assistant engineer
 Pasquale DelVillaggio – assistant engineer, production assistant 
 Glenn Meadows – mastering 
 Ramona Simmons – project administrator 
 Maude Gilman – art direction, design
 Jeff Frazier – photography 
 Sheri McCoy – stylist 
 Ted Hacker – management 

Studios
 Recorded at Midtown Tone & Volume and Room & Board Recording (Nashville, Tennessee); The Castle (Franklin, Tennessee).
 Mixed and Mastered at Masterfonics (Nashville, Tennessee).

Chart performance

Certifications

1992 albums
Diamond Rio albums
Arista Records albums